The Jamestown School is a historic school building in rural central western Independence County, Arkansas.  It is located in the hamlet of Jamestown, just north of Arkansas Highway 230 at the junction of Race Street and Snapp Lane.  It is a single-story wood-frame structure, with a T-shaped plan, cross-gable roof, novelty siding, and stone foundation.  It is stylistically Craftsman, mostly in plan and layout of windows.   It was built in 1926, and was used as a county school until 1949.

The building was listed on the National Register of Historic Places in 1992.

See also
National Register of Historic Places listings in Independence County, Arkansas

References

School buildings on the National Register of Historic Places in Arkansas
National Register of Historic Places in Independence County, Arkansas
Schools in Independence County, Arkansas
1926 establishments in Arkansas
School buildings completed in 1926
American Craftsman architecture in Arkansas
Bungalow architecture in Arkansas